The New Evangelical Partnership for the Common Good (NEP) is a faith-based nonprofit group that offers a renewed Christian public witness for the sake of the Gospel and the common good.

Mission statement
The New Evangelical Partnership for the Common Good (NEP) "exists to advance human well-being as an expression of our love for Jesus Christ, which is itself a grateful response to his love for us and for a good but suffering world."

Organization
NEP was founded by Richard Cizik, the former Vice President of Governmental Affairs at the National Association of Evangelicals; David P. Gushee, professor of Christian Ethics at Mercer University; and Steven D. Martin, a pastor and documentary filmmaker.

The nonprofit describes itself in three ways:

Founders
Richard Cizik
David P. Gushee 
Steven D. Martin

Board members
 Lisa Sharon Harper, NY Faith & Justice
 Rev. Dr. Cheryl Bridges Johns, Church of God Theological Seminary
 Katie Paris, Faith in Public Life
 Rev. Gabriel Salguero, The Lamb's Church
 Dr. Glen Harold Stassen, Fuller Theological Seminary

References

External links
New Evangelical Partnership for the Common Good

Evangelicalism in the United States
Evangelical parachurch organizations
Christian organizations established in 2010
2010 establishments in the United States